An All-American team is an honorary sports team composed of the best amateur players of a specific season for each team position—who in turn are given the honorific "All-America" and typically referred to as "All-American athletes", or simply "All-Americans".  Although the honorees generally do not compete together as a unit, the term is used in U.S. team sports to refer to players who are selected by members of the national media.  Walter Camp selected the first All-America team in the early days of American football in 1889.  The 2009 NCAA Men's Basketball All-Americans are honorary lists that includes All-American selections from the Associated Press (AP), the United States Basketball Writers Association (USBWA), the Sporting News (TSN), and the National Association of Basketball Coaches (NABC) drawn from the 2008–09 NCAA Division I men's basketball season.  All selectors choose at least a first and second 5-man team. The NABC, AP and TSN choose third teams, while AP also lists honorable mention selections.

The Consensus 2009 College Basketball All-American team is determined by aggregating the results of the four major All-American teams as determined by the National Collegiate Athletic Association (NCAA).  Since United Press International was replaced by TSN in 1997, the four major selectors have been the aforementioned ones.  AP has been a selector since 1948, NABC since 1957 and USBWA since 1960.  To earn "consensus" status, a player must win honors based on a point system computed from the four different all-America teams. The point system consists of three points for first team, two points for second team and one point for third team. No honorable mention or fourth team or lower are used in the computation.  The top five totals plus ties are first team and the next five plus ties are second team.  According to this system, DeJuan Blair, Stephen Curry, Blake Griffin, Tyler Hansbrough and James Harden were first team selections and Sherron Collins, Luke Harangody, Ty Lawson, Jodie Meeks, Jeff Teague and Hasheem Thabeet were second team selections.

Although the aforementioned lists are used to determine consensus honors, there are numerous other All-American lists.  The ten finalists for the John Wooden Award are described as Wooden All-Americans.  The ten finalists for the Lowe's Senior CLASS Award are described as Senior All-Americans.  Other All-American lists include those determined by Fox Sports, and Yahoo! Sports.  The scholar-athletes selected by College Sports Information Directors of America (CoSIDA) are termed Academic All-Americans.

2009 Consensus All-America team
PG – Point guard
SG – Shooting guard
PF – Power forward
SF – Small forward
C – Center

The following players were consensus All-Americans.

Individual All-America teams
The table below details the selections for four major 2009 college basketball All-American teams.  The number corresponding to the team designation (i.e., whether a player was a first team, second team, etc. selection) appears in the table.  The following columns are included in the table:

Player – The name of the All-American
School – Collegiate affiliation
AP – Associated Press All-American Team
USBWA – United States Basketball Writers Association All-American Team
NABC – National Association of Basketball Coaches All-American Team
TSN – Sporting News All-American Team
CP – Points in the consensus scoring system

By player

By team

AP Honorable Mention:

 Jeff Adrien, Connecticut
 Josh Akognon, Cal State Fullerton
 Cole Aldrich, Kansas
 Alex Barnett, Dartmouth
 Marqus Blakely, Vermont
 Craig Brackins, Iowa State
 Michael Bramos, Miami (OH)
 Jon Brockman, Washington
 Brandon Brooks, Alabama State
 John Bryant, Santa Clara
 Chase Budinger, Arizona
 DeMarre Carroll, Missouri
 Jeremy Chappell, Robert Morris
 Dionte Christmas, Temple
 Earl Clark, Louisville
 Darren Collison, UCLA
 Dante Cunningham, Villanova
 Devan Downey, South Carolina
 Tyreke Evans, Memphis
 Levance Fields, Pittsburgh
 Jonny Flynn, Syracuse
 Kenny Hasbrouck, Siena
 Jordan Hill, Arizona
 Matt Howard, Butler
 Lester Hudson, Tennessee-Martin
 Matt Kingsley, Stephen F. Austin
 Kalin Lucas, Michigan State
 Eric Maynor, VCU
 Kellen McCoy, Weber State
 Tywain McKee, Coppin State
 Orlando Mendez-Valdez, Western Kentucky
 Derrick Mercer, American
 Luke Nevill, Utah
 Ahmad Nivins, Saint Joseph's
 Artsiom Parakhouski, Radford
 A. J. Price, Connecticut
 Alex Renfroe, Belmont
 Tyrese Rice, Boston College
 Kyle Singler, Duke
 Jermaine Taylor, Central Florida
 Jeff Teague, Wake Forest
 Marcus Thornton, LSU
 Evan Turner, Ohio State
 Jarvis Varnado, Mississippi State
 Gary Wilkinson, Utah State
 Booker Woodfox, Creighton
 Ben Woodside, North Dakota State

Academic All-Americans
On February 25, 2009, CoSIDA and ESPN The Magazine announced the 2009 Academic All-American team with Brett Winkelman headlining the University Division as the men's college basketball Academic All-American of the Year.

2008–09 ESPN The Magazine Academic All-America Men's Basketball Team (University Division) as selected by CoSIDA:

Wooden All-Americans
The ten finalists (and ties) for the  John R. Wooden Award are called Wooden All-Americans.  The 11 honorees are as follows:

Senior All-Americans
The ten finalists for the Lowe's Senior CLASS Award are called Senior All-Americans.  The 10 honorees are as follows:

References

All-Americans
NCAA Men's Basketball All-Americans